A Place to Land is the second and final studio album by American R&B group Dakota Moon, released in February 2002 on Elektra Records.

The title track "Looking for a Place to Land" peaked at No. 30 on the Hot Adult Contemporary Tracks. The track "Getaway Car" has been covered by country groups 4 Runner and The Jenkins, Christian singer Susan Ashton, and the hugely popular duo Hall & Oates.

Track listing

References

2002 albums
Dakota Moon albums
Elektra Records albums